The following article presents a summary of the 2007 football (soccer) season in Brazil, which was the 106th season of competitive football in the country.

Campeonato Brasileiro Série A

São Paulo declared as the Campeonato Brasileiro champions.

Relegation
The four worst placed teams, which are Corinthians, Paraná, Juventude and América-RN, were relegated to the following year's second level.

Campeonato Brasileiro Série B

Coritiba declared as the Campeonato Brasileiro Série B champions.

Promotion
The four best placed teams, which are Coritiba, Ipatinga, Portuguesa and Vitória, were promoted to the following year's first level.

Relegation
The four worst placed teams, which are Paulista, Santa Cruz, Remo and Ituano, were relegated to the following year's third level.

Campeonato Brasileiro Série C

Bragantino declared as the Campeonato Brasileiro Série C champions.

Promotion
The four best placed teams in the final stage of the competition, which are Bragantino, Bahia, Vila Nova-GO and ABC, were promoted to the following year's second level.

Copa do Brasil

The Copa do Brasil final was played between Fluminense and Figueirense.

Fluminense declared as the cup champions by aggregate score of 2-1.

State championship champions

Youth competition champions

Other competition champions

Brazilian clubs in international competitions

Brazil national team
The following table lists all the games played by the Brazil national football team in official competitions and friendly matches during 2007.

Women's football

Brazil women's national football team
The following table lists all the games played by the Brazil women's national football team in official competitions and friendly matches during 2007.

The Brazil women's national football team competed in the following competitions in 2007:

Copa do Brasil de Futebol Feminino

The Copa do Brasil de Futebol Feminino final was played between Mato Grosso do Sul/Saad and Botucatu.

Mato Grosso do Sul/Saad declared as the cup champions after beating Botucatu 5-4 on penalties.

Other domestic competition champions

References

 Brazilian competitions at RSSSF
 2007 Brazil national team matches at RSSSF
 2004-2007 Brazil women's national team matches at RSSSF

 
Seasons in Brazilian football
Brazil